The 1986 Midwestern Collegiate Conference men's basketball tournament (now known as the Horizon League men's basketball tournament) was held February 27–March 1 at Market Square Arena in Indianapolis, Indiana.

Xavier defeated  in the championship game, 74–66, to win their first MCC/Horizon League men's basketball tournament.

The Musketeers received an automatic bid to the 1986 NCAA tournament as the #12 seed in the Southeast region.

Format
All seven conference members participated in the tournament and were seeded based on regular season conference records.

Bracket

References

Horizon League men's basketball tournament
Tournament
Midwestern City Conference men's basketball tournament
Midwestern City Conference men's basketball tournament
Midwestern City Conference men's basketball tournament